Eric Joyce (3 July 1924 – 1977) was an English professional footballer who played as a wing half.

Career
Born in Durham, Joyce played for Eppleton CW, Bradford City and Consett.

References

1924 births
1977 deaths
English footballers
Bradford City A.F.C. players
Consett A.F.C. players
English Football League players
Association football midfielders